Joseph Zyss (born in 1950) is a French physicist who specialises in molecular photonics and nonlinear optics. He is the author or co-author of more than 600 articles in the field.

Career
From 1975 to 1997, Zyss worked at the CNET's Bagneux Laboratory. Subsequently he has worked in the Laboratoire de photonique quantique et moléculaire (UMR 8537), and is its former director (1998–2006). He also founded the European Associated Laboratory (LEA NaBi), a collaboration between CNRS and the Weizmann Institute of Science in the field of nanobiotechnologies. As of 2018, he is an Emeritus professor at the École normale supérieure de Cachan.

Research
His research has focused on molecular photonics. He specialises in molecular-level nonlinear optical effects. These researches have linked basic physical chemistry with technologies and applications including polymers for information technology and biophotonics imaging.

Awards and honours

See also
 Alain Aspect
 Claude Fabre

References

External links
 https://web.archive.org/web/20180916202840/https://www.frenchscienceindia.org/5-questions-to-joseph-zyss-ens-cachan/
 http://www.coria.fr/dycoec/spip.php?auteur27
 http://www2.cnrs.fr/en/1646.htm

1950 births
Living people
People from Neuilly-sur-Seine
French physicists
Fellows of Optica (society)